The Hive Group was a software company that applied visualization technology in operational intelligence (OI), business intelligence (BI), and complex event processing (CEP) contexts. The company primarily developed enterprise treemapping software used by major corporations and public agencies such as Intel Corporation, Procter & Gamble, Sun Microsystems, the United States Army, the United States Marine Corps, and the United States Coast Guard.

On January 26, 2015, The Hive Group announced that it had merged with Visual Action Software.

History

The Hive Group is a privately held company founded in 2000, with headquarters in Richardson, Texas.
The company’s treemapping software is called Honeycomb.  Ben Shneiderman, the inventor of the treemap concept, is a member of The Hive Group’s Board of Advisors.
The number of employees is believed to be fewer than 50.

Industry recognition – Early adoption by the United States Marine Corps

A large quantity of information can be found, both in printed form and on the internet, detailing the Honeycomb-based USMC MERIT application.  In 2003, the USMC deployed treemaps to all theaters of USMC operation.
This deployment has led to broad adoption of treemaps within the United States Department of Defense and has received the following industry awards and recognition:
 US Department of Navy eGov
 US Department of Defense CIO (second place, team category)
 Excellence.Gov - Federal CIO
 Government Computing News
 International Society of Logistics Field Award
 The Association for Enterprise Information Excellence in Enterprise Integration
 Defense Logistics 2008 Technology Implementation of the Year

Public sector

The Hive Group is registered as a small business in Central Contractor Registration (CCR), and in the United Nations Global Marketplace.

Patents

The Hive Group holds several patents around treemapping technology (US Patents 7,027,052; 7,076,742; 7,346,858; and 7,509,591).

Board of directors and advisors

The Hive Group’s board of directors and advisors include:

 Bill Jesse: Chairman, Jesse Capital Management
 Ben Shneiderman: inventor of treemapping; founding director, Human Computer Interaction Lab at the University of Maryland, College Park
 Joseph P. Urso: CEO, Aerus LLC; Chairman, Inthinc
 Pierluigi Zappacosta: Chairman, Digital Persona; Chairman, Sierra Sciences; Founder and former CEO, Logitech

External links
 Visual Action Software Website
 Treemap sample from The Hive Group
 Ben Shneiderman at the University of Maryland
 The Hive Group Gallery
 The Washington Post, The Next Frontier: Decoding the Internet's Raw Data
 USMC MERIT Joint Release Announcement
 Finding the Needle in the Haystack
 A Picture Worth a Thousand Control Loops
London 2012 Olympics – Interactive Medal Standings (by country, sport, event, medal & athlete)

References

Software companies established in 2000
Software companies based in Texas
Privately held companies based in Texas
Companies based in Richardson, Texas
Defunct software companies of the United States
2000 establishments in the United States
2000 establishments in Texas
Companies established in 2000